Porumbacu may refer to: 

Porumbacu de Jos, a commune in Sibiu County, Romania
Porumbacu de Sus, a village in the commune Porumbacu de Jos, Sibiu County, Romania
Porumbacu (river), a river in Sibiu County, Romania
Veronica Porumbacu, a Romanian poet